The Golden Globe Award for Best Motion Picture – Drama is a Golden Globe Award that has been awarded annually since 1944 by the Hollywood Foreign Press Association (HFPA). Since its institution in 1943, the Hollywood Foreign Press Association is an organization of journalists who cover the film industry in the United States, but are affiliated with publications outside North America.

When the awards were introduced, there was a single category for Best Picture. Starting with the 9th Golden Globe Awards, the Golden Globes split the Acting and Best Picture awards into Drama and Musical or Comedy categories. Since 1951, the only time the awards were reunified was in 1953.

This award goes to the producers of the film. In the following lists, the first titles listed are winners. These are also in bold and in blue background; those not in bold are nominees.

The years given are those in which the films under consideration were released, not the year of the ceremony, which always takes place the following year.

1940s

1950s

1960s

1970s

1980s

1990s

2000s

2010s

2020s

See also
 BAFTA Award for Best Film
 Academy Award for Best Picture
 Critics' Choice Movie Award for Best Picture
 Golden Globe Award for Best Motion Picture – Musical or Comedy
 Producers Guild of America Award for Best Theatrical Motion Picture
 Screen Actors Guild Award for Outstanding Performance by a Cast in a Motion Picture

References
Specific

General

 
 

Golden Globe Awards

Awards for best film
Lists of films by award